The 1974 Grand Prix motorcycle racing season was the 26th F.I.M. Road Racing World Championship season.

Season summary
MV Agusta and Phil Read claimed a second successive 500cc crown. It would be the Italian firm's last world championship and their seventeenth 500cc title in a row. Giacomo Agostini switched to the two-stroke Yamahas but was troubled by injuries and mechanical troubles. Suzuki started to get competitive with Barry Sheene and Jack Findlay on four cylinder two-strokes. MV Agusta pulled out of the 350cc class, giving Agostini a free run, taking his fourteenth world title. Walter Villa took over for the deceased Renzo Pasolini and won the 250cc crown giving Harley-Davidson the title after they bought the Aermacchi factory, reworked  and renamed the bikes. Kent Andersson won his second championship title in the 125cc class. Kreidler continued to dominate the 50cc class with Dutchman Henk Van Kessel winning the crown.

Safety continued to be an issue with most riders boycotting the rainy German round at the improved Nürburgring Nordschleife as the track had not been fitted with straw bales to accommodate automobile racing on the same day. Thus, rather unknown German riders took all wins. It served as a focal point in the increasingly bitter debate about safety. British rider Billie Nelson died after crashing into the crowd during the 250cc Yugoslavian Grand Prix, injuring several spectators. He died later that night at a hospital.

1974 Grand Prix season calendar

Final standings

1974 500 cc Roadracing World Championship final standings

1974 350 cc Roadracing World Championship final standings

1974 250 cc Roadracing World Championship final standings

1974 125 cc Roadracing World Championship final standings

1974 50 cc Roadracing World Championship final standings

References

 Büla, Maurice & Schertenleib, Jean-Claude (2001). Continental Circus 1949-2000. Chronosports S.A. 

Grand Prix motorcycle racing seasons